Seney is an unincorporated community in Schoolcraft County in the Upper Peninsula of Michigan, United States. State trunkline highway M-28 runs directly though Seney.

The historic community of Seney began as a railroad stop in 1881.  Soon after, logging companies moved into the area to lumber the white pine forests in the surrounding region.  Seney quickly grew to over 3,000 people.  During this time, the town gained a reputation for being rowdy and dangerous due its boom economy and numerous saloons.  By the end of the nineteenth century, the forests of pine in the surrounding region were depleted, due to the logging and numerous fires, and the lumber companies left, shrinking the town considerably. It currently has less than 200 people.

Today, the town is noted as a gateway to the region's recreation and tourism.  It is located on the outskirts of the Seney National Wildlife Refuge, administered by the U.S. Fish and Wildlife Service, and it is a through way to the eastern end of the Pictured Rocks National Lakeshore. Seney is also the terminus of the hiking trail known as the Fox River Pathway (which connects with the North Country Trail).

The town was featured in Ernest Hemingway's short story "Big Two-Hearted River" which Hemingway based on a visit to the town that he made in his youth; he also mentioned the town in his 1923 poem "Along with Youth."  Leon Czolgosz, the man who assassinated President William Mckinley, lived in Seney during the boom years when he worked on the local railroad.

Seney is located on the eastern end of the Seney Stretch.  A "Boot Hill" cemetery is located outside of town. The community is located in Seney Township, Michigan.

Incredible Seney: The First Complete Story of Michigan's Fabulous Lumber Town (1953) is a nonfiction book about Seney's historic boom years written by Lewis Reimann.

References

External links 
 Official website for the Seney National Wildlife Refuge Last updated: September 16, 2012
 Upper Peninsula Online, Seney Information
 
 

Unincorporated communities in Schoolcraft County, Michigan

vo:Seney